is a former Japanese enka singer within Hello! Project. She started her career under the enka record label Teichiku in 2000 with her debut single "Naki Usagi", but did not have any charting singles in Japan until she signed with Up-Front Works and their label Zetima in 2003. In mid-2004 she was transferred to another Up-Front Works' label, Rice Music.

Discography 
The following CDs are released by Teichiku, Zetima, and Rice Music.

Singles

Albums

References

External links 
 Official Hello! Project profile

1979 births
Living people
Enka singers
Japanese idols
Hello! Project solo singers
Salt5 members
People from Kōchi Prefecture
Musicians from Kōchi Prefecture